Andy McNally (born 9 January 1982) is a former professional rugby league footballer who played in the 2000s.

Club career
Andy McNally made his début for the Featherstone Rovers on Sunday 19 January 2003, and he played his last match (in his second spell) for Featherstone Rovers during the 2005 season.

References

External links
McNally quits Rovers to rejoin old club Castleford
Andy McNally Memory Box Search at archive.castigersheritage.com

1982 births
Living people
Castleford Tigers players
English rugby league players
Featherstone Rovers players
London Broncos players
Place of birth missing (living people)
Rugby league centres
Rugby league five-eighths
Rugby league fullbacks
Rugby league wingers